Action Reaction is the debut album by American Post-punk band Get Smart!, released on Enigma Records' "Fever" imprint in 1984.

Info
It was originally announced, in Nebraska's "Capitol Punishment", that the album would be released on the "Fresh Sounds" label, which had previously released the band's debut single and the "Fresh Sounds" cassette, but the band eventually signed with the Philadelphia based "Fever Records" (not to be confused with the New York-based label of the same name), so the album was actually released on that label.

The album was originally recorded by Michael McGee and produced by Taylor Ross at Media Sound in Oklahoma City.  Ross then recruited Iain Burgess to remix the album for release at Chicago Recording Company in Chicago.

An earlier version of "Ankle Deep In Mud" had appeared on their debut single, "Numbers and Colours", and an earlier version of "Black Mirror" has appeared on the "Sub Pop #7" compilation cassette.

All songs were written by the band, except for "Ankle Deep In Mud" which was written by Vance Lyons, and "Black Mirror" where the lyrics were written by Vance Lyons and the music was written by Get Smart!. (Vance Lyons had played with Marc Koch in a previous band called the Battling Tops.)

Side 1 and Side 2 were originally supposed to be reversed, as the album was supposed to start with "On And On" and then end with "You've Got To Stop" (i.e. it would start with "On" and end with "Stop"), but for some unknown reason this was reversed in the final product.

Track listing
Side 1:
"Because Of Green" – 3:03
"What It Is We Fear" – 3:18
"Knight" – 2:18
"Ankle Deep In Mud" – 4:55
"You've Got To Stop" – 3:38

Side 2:
"On And On" – 2:02
"Just For The Moment" – 2:23
"The Difference" – 3:02
"Face" – 2:36
"Black Mirror" – 2:18
"Berlin On The Plains" – 2:47
"They Walk In Pairs " – 1:58

Personnel
Marc Koch – vocals, guitar
Lisa Wertman Crowe – vocals, bass
Frank Loose – vocals, drums

Reception
 "This is what happened to Midwestern bar bands when they heard the Sex Pistols.  Lots of beat and jangle; it's raw and rocking" (Barbara Nellis, Playboy, March 1985)
 "Warm pop melodicism competes with punky bluntness and jagged noise tendencies on Action Reaction, creating a variety of stylistic voices within the plainly constructed guitar-bass-drums framework; harmony vocals add to the appeal." (Ira Robbins, Trouser Press, 1986)

References

External links

1984 debut albums
Albums produced by Iain Burgess
Enigma Records albums
Get Smart! (band) albums